Stuart Grosvenor Stickney (March 9, 1877 – September 24, 1932) was an American golfer who competed in the 1904 Summer Olympics. In 1904, Stickney was part of the American team which won the silver medal. He finished 15th in this competition. In the individual competition, Stickney finished first in the qualification but was eliminated in the second round of the match play.

Stickney won the Trans-Mississippi Amateur in 1913.

References

External links
 Profile

American male golfers
Amateur golfers
Golfers at the 1904 Summer Olympics
Olympic silver medalists for the United States in golf
Medalists at the 1904 Summer Olympics
1877 births
1932 deaths